This is a list of notable Jewish American cartoonists.  For other Jewish Americans, see Lists of Jewish Americans.

 
 Adam Kubert, comics artist

 Al Capp, cartoonist (Li'l Abner)

 Al Hirschfeld, caricaturist

 Al Jaffee, cartoonist (MAD Magazine)

 Alan Weiss, comics artist and writer

 Aline Kominsky-Crumb, cartoonist (Dirty Laundry)

 Allan Heinberg, comic book writer (Young Avengers) 

 Art Spiegelman, comics writer (Maus)

 Bill Finger, comics artist and creator of Batman

 Bob Kane, comics artist (Batman)

 Brian Michael Bendis, comic book writer

 Daniel Clowes, alternative comics writer (Ghost World)

 Dave Berg, cartoonist (Mad)

 Eli Valley, cartoonist and author best known for Diaspora Boy.

 Gene Colan, comic book artist (Daredevil)

 Gil Kane, comics artist (Green Lantern)

 Harry Hershfield, cartoonist (Abie the Agent, Desperate Desmond)

 Harvey Kurtzman, comics artist and Mad editor

 Harvey Pekar, comix writer (American Splendor)

 Herblock, cartoonist; three Pulitzer Prizes

 Howard Chaykin, comic book writer

 Jack Kirby, comics artist and writer (Captain America, Fantastic Four, Hulk, Fourth World (comics))

 Jerome Siegel, comics artist (Superman)

 Joe Kubert, comics artist

 Joe Shuster, comics artist (Superman)

 John Broome

 Jordan B. Gorfinkel, comic book writer (Batman) and cartoonist

 Jules Feiffer, cartoonist

 Lyonel Feininger, cartoonist (Kin-der-Kids) 

 Martin Nodell, comics artist (Green Lantern)

 Mat Tonti, comics writer ("The Book of Secrets")

 Max Gaines, founder of EC Comics, pioneering figure in the creation of the modern comic book

 Mell Lazarus, cartoonist (Momma, Miss Peach)

 Milt Gross, Gross Exaggerations

 Neal Adams, comic book artist 

 Neil Kleid, cartoonist, graphic designer

 Nina Paley, cartoonist, animator and free culture activist (Sita Sings the Blues).

 Otto Binder, author.

 Peter David, comics writer and "writer of stuff" 

 Ralph Bakshi, animator (Fritz the Cat, The Lord of the Rings)

 Robert Mankoff

 Roz Chast, cartoonist (the New Yorker)

 Rube Goldberg, cartoonist

 Stan Lee, comics writer (co-creator of Spider-Man, co-creator of X-Men, Hulk, Fantastic Four)

 Trina Robbins, comix writer

 Will Eisner, comics artist (The Spirit)

 William Gaines, comics artist and Mad founder

See also
 The Amazing Adventures of Kavalier & Clay (2000 novel)
 List of documentary films about comics

References

External links
"The creation of a Jewish cartoon space in the New York and Warsaw Yiddish press, 1884—1939", Portnoy, Edward A., The Jewish Theological Seminary of America, 2008

Cartoonists
 Jewish
Jewish American cartoonists
Jewish American cartoonists